Rufus King was a lawyer from Cincinnati, Ohio who served as Dean of the Cincinnati Law School and president of the University of Cincinnati in the late nineteenth century. He also served as president of a convention that met to write a new constitution for the state of Ohio, and authored a history of the state of Ohio.

Early life
Rufus King was born May 30, 1817 at Chillicothe, Ohio. His parents were Edward King and Sarah Ann (née Worthington) King.  His grandfathers were U.S. Senator and the U.S. Ambassador to the United Kingdom Rufus King and U.S. Senator and Ohio Governor Thomas Worthington.

He entered Kenyon College, and transferred to Harvard University, where he graduated. He studied law under Joseph Story at Harvard Law School, and moved to Cincinnati, Ohio in March, 1841, where he was admitted to the bar.

Career
In 1851, Woodward High School and Hughes High School were consolidated, and King was elected president of the board of managers to the joint school in 1853, a position he held the rest of his life. He was also a member of the board of education of Cincinnati, (for primary schools), from 1851 to 1866, and was president of the board for eleven years.

In 1853, King urged the state commissioner of common schools that the public school libraries should be consolidated in cities. This led to the central library in Cincinnati. In 1867, King was elected to the board of directors of the library, and he was president of the board from 1870 to 1873.

In 1869, after King was no longer on the Cincinnati school board, the board passed a resolution banning "religious instruction and reading from religious books, including the Holy Bible." King was retained by those who opposed the resolution in court in the "Bible Case". The resolution was upheld. One commentator noted: "The first lawyers of the state took part in it. Men on the streets, in the marts of business, wherever intelligence met intelligence, waged the warfare without cessation. There were those who honestly thought that the pillars of the Commonwealth were being rudely shaken; that destruction was inevitable. But the schools survived."

War activities
During the American Civil War, King was entrusted by Governor William Dennison, Jr. to meet with citizens of Louisville from the neutral state of Kentucky, to assure them Ohio would not embargo shipping goods to that state. It turned out that that would not be the position of the citizens of Cincinnati, or of the federal government.

Government activities
In 1846, King was a member of conventions to form a citycharter. He was electeded a members of city council in 1848 and served one term. In 1872 he was elected to a constitutional convention to write a new constitution for Ohio. The convention met in Columbus starting in 1873, with Morrison Waite as the president of the convention. The meeting moved to Cincinnati in October, 1873. When Waite was made Chief Justice of the United States in early 1874, King became president of the convention. The Board of Tax Commissioners was created in 1883, and consisted of three men from the city. He serves as vice-president in past of the board until it was dissolved in 1891.

University activities

In 1859, King was elected by city council a director of McMicken University. On December 30 of that year, he was selected president of the board, and was re-elected each year until the name of the school was changed to the University of Cincinnati in 1870. He was then president of that board until 1877.

Rufus King's father was one of the founders of the Cincinnati Law School. Rufus King taught at the school, and was Dean of the Faculty from 1875 to 1880. He resigned the deanship, but continued to teach constitutional law and the law of real property until his death.

Legal activities
King was the second president of the Ohio State Bar Association from 1881 to 1882. He was president of the Cincinnati Bar Association for forty years. In 1864, Governor John Brough offered King a seat on the Ohio Supreme Court, which he declined. The Cincinnati Law Library Association was formed in 1847 by King, Alphonso Taft, Bellamy Storer, Salmon P. Chase and others. King was elected president of the board of directors in 1855, and held the office 36 years until his death.

King also served as a director of the Cincinnati Southern Railway and Cincinnati, Hamilton and Dayton Railroad companies. For a short time he acted as president of each.

Literary activities
In 1888, King authored Ohio, First Fruits of the Ordinance of 1787, one of a collection of state histories in Horace Scudder's American Commonwealths series. His widow wrote: "Among other things, it was his wish to enlarge his history of Ohio, which he had written under the disadvantage of being compelled to abridge the volume to a uniform size of a series for which he had undertaken to write. ... Mr. King's great desire, however, was to prepare a much-needed law book on a subject which for years had been a study of deep thought and research."

Personal life
On May 18, 1843, King married Margaret Rives, daughter of Dr. Landon C. Rives, of Cincinnati, and niece of William Cabell Rives. Margaret's sister Anna married into Cincinnati's Longworth family. Rufus and Margaret King had no children.

He was a member of the Episcopal Church, and attended St. Paul Cathedral, where he was a vestryman for 36 years. He was a friend and legal advisor for Bishops Charles Pettit McIlvaine and Gregory T. Bedell, and a trustee of Kenyon College.

King died at Cincinnati on March 25, 1891. His funeral was held at St. Paul Cathedral. He was buried at Spring Grove Cemetery, where he had been elected a director in 1878, serving until his death. Among the pall-bearers were Judson Harmon, Manning Force, William S. Groesbeck, Jacob Dolson Cox and George Hoadly.

Publications

Notes

References

External links

|-

|-

1891 deaths
1817 births
19th-century American railroad executives
19th-century American historians
19th-century American male writers
Burials at Spring Grove Cemetery
Cincinnati City Council members
Harvard Law School alumni
Kenyon College alumni
Members of the Kenyon College Board of Trustees
Ohio Constitutional Convention (1873)
Ohio lawyers
Politicians from Chillicothe, Ohio
Politicians from Cincinnati
Presidents of the University of Cincinnati
University of Cincinnati College of Law faculty
19th-century American politicians
19th-century American lawyers
19th-century American Episcopalians
American male non-fiction writers
Historians from Ohio